Epirotic cuisine is the traditional Greek cuisine of the region of Epirus. It is based mostly on dairy products; butter and various cheeses.

Appetizers and cheeses

 Anthotyros
 Feta
 Galotyri
 Kaskavali
 Kefalograviera
 Kefalotyri
 Metsovone, Foumarino, Boukovela and Metsovela from Metsovo
 Tyrogliata
 Vasilotyri
 Ourda cheese

Dishes and specialities
Many types of pites (pies) including kasiopita (kikitsopita), kothropita, kimadopita, pepéki, kasiata and blatsariá
 Hilopites
 Frog legs
 Kontosouvli
 Loukaniko
 Trahanas

Desserts/drinks
 Amygdalopita
 Spoon sweets
 Klostari
Blatsara
Stegnopita (dry pie)
Kassiopita (flour pie)
 Flogera (Metsovo)
 Greek wine

References

External links
Greek gastronomy
Gastrotourismos

Greek cuisine
Epirus (region)